Thomas Richmond Leuty (1853 – 15 April 1911), was a British Liberal Party politician.

Background
Leuty was born in Leeds, the son of Thomas Leuty. He was educated at Bramham College.

Political career
Leuty was Liberal candidate for the Leeds North division at the 1892 General Election. The division was a Unionist seat and he came in second. He served as Mayor of Leeds from 1893–94. He was then Liberal candidate for the Leeds East division at the 1895 General Election. This division was already a Liberal seat and he held it at the election. He served one term in parliament and stood down at the 1900 General Election. He did not stand for parliament again.

Electoral record

References

External links 
 

1853 births
1911 deaths
Liberal Party (UK) MPs for English constituencies
UK MPs 1895–1900